SciDB is a column-oriented database management system (DBMS) designed for multidimensional data management and analytics common to scientific, geospatial, financial, and industrial applications.  It is developed by Paradigm4 and co-created by Michael Stonebraker.

History 
Stonebraker claims that arrays are 100 times faster in SciDB than in a relational DBMS on a class of problems. It is swapping rows and columns for mathematical arrays that put fewer restrictions on the data and can work in any number of dimensions unlike the conventionally widely used relational database management system model, in which each relation supports only one dimension of records.

A 2011 conference presentation on SciDB promoted it as "not Hadoop".
Marilyn Matz became chief executive Paradigm4  in 2014.

See also

 Comparison of object database management systems
 Comparison of structured storage software

References

External links
 SciDB website

Data management
Distributed data stores
Document-oriented databases
Distributed computing architecture
Free database management systems
Structured storage
NoSQL
Software using the GNU AGPL license